Joseph Bosisto CMG, MLA JP (21 March 1827 – 8 November 1898), was a chemist and politician in colonial Victoria, Australia.

Background
Bosisto was the son of William Bosisto and Maria née Lazenby, of Cookham, Berkshire, and was born on 21 March 1827, at Hammersmith. Becoming a druggist, he emigrated to Adelaide, South Australia, arriving in October 1848 aboard Competitor, and is claimed to have established the business of Messrs. Faulding & Co. He proceeded to Melbourne in 1851, and began business at Richmond.

Professional activities

Bosisto went largely into the manufacture of its products. The Pharmaceutical Society of Victoria was founded mainly through his instrumentality in 1857. He was twice mayor of Richmond, and chairman of the local bench for five years consecutively.

Assemblies and Commissions
From 1874 to 1889 he was M.L.A. for the city, but was defeated in the latter year. He was part of the commission for the 1875 Victorian Intercolonial Exhibition in Melbourne, then having represented Victoria at the Calcutta Exhibition in 1883, he was appointed President of the Royal Commission of that colony at the Colonial and Indian Exhibition, held at South Kensington in 1886, for his services at which he was created C.M.G. on 28 June of that year. Bosisto was a J.P. for Victoria, and was president of the Technological Commission, and Examiner in Materia Medica and Botany at the College of Pharmacy.

In April 1892 Bosisto was re-elected to the Assembly for Jolimont and West Richmond, and he continued in that seat until September 1894.

Other
He married Eliza Johnston in Adelaide in 1852, there was no issue from this marriage. His estate was bequeathed to several nephews and nieces.

Several Australian botanical species are named in honour of Bosisto, including Bosistoa floydii.

See also
 French Australians

References

1827 births
1898 deaths
Members of the Victorian Legislative Assembly
19th-century Australian politicians
Australian inventors
Australian company founders